Dijana is a given name. Notable people with the name include:

Dijana Bolanča (born 1974), Croatian actress
Dijana Budisavljevic (1891–1978), Austrian humanitarian
Dijana Čuljak, Croatian television host
Dijana Jovetić (born 1984), Croatian handball player
Dijana Mugoša (born 1995), Montenegrin handball player
Dijana Radojević (born 1990), Serbian handball player
Dijana Ravnikar (born 1978), Slovenian biathlete and Cross-country skier
Dijana Števin (born 1986), Serbian handballer
Dijana Ujkić (born 1996), Montenegrin handball player

Croatian feminine given names
Serbian feminine given names
Slovene feminine given names